Bilawal Bhatti (born 17 September 1991) is an international cricketer from Pakistan, primarily utilized as an all-rounder. He made his ODI debut against South Africa in Cape Town in 2013, and made his mark immediately with both bat and ball, hitting 39 off 25 balls, and taking 3 for 37 in a Pakistan win.

In the final of the 2015–16 Quaid-e-Azam Trophy, Bhatti recorded his best figures in first-class cricket with 8 for 88, and his best overall match figures, with 11 for 95.

Career
In November, Bhatti was part of the team at the Asian Games in Guangzhou, China which won a bronze medal by beating Sri Lanka in the 3rd place playoffs. He is a genuine and complete all-rounder.

On 20 November 2013, he was included in national team to represent in T20 for Pakistan against South Africa.
Bilawal played his first test against Sri Lanka and enjoyed a fine debut, taking 5 wickets in 2 innings. In second test, he contributed 24 not out in the first innings, before getting 32 runs in the second innings.

It went downhill from there however, as he conceded 40 runs in an over vs Australia at the WT20 2014, while bowling to Maxwell and Finch. He also conceded 93 runs in the 2nd ODI vs New Zealand in 2015, equaling the record of the most expensive figures for a Pakistani bowler with Wahab Riaz.

In 2017, Bhatti was chosen by the Lahore Qalanders franchise to compete in the forthcoming third season of the Pakistan Super League (PSL), however a shoulder injury meant he was unable to take any part in the league.

He was the leading wicket-taker for Sui Northern Gas Pipelines Limited in the 2018–19 Quaid-e-Azam Trophy, with 36 dismissals in ten matches. In March 2019, he was named in Punjab's squad for the 2019 Pakistan Cup.

In September 2019, he was named in Southern Punjab's squad for the 2019–20 Quaid-e-Azam Trophy tournament.

References

1991 births
Living people
Pakistani cricketers
Pakistan Test cricketers
Pakistan One Day International cricketers
Pakistan Twenty20 International cricketers
Cricketers at the 2010 Asian Games
Asian Games bronze medalists for Pakistan
Asian Games medalists in cricket
Sialkot cricketers
Sui Northern Gas Pipelines Limited cricketers
Sialkot Stallions cricketers
People from Muridke
Karachi Kings cricketers
Lahore Qalandars cricketers
Chattogram Challengers cricketers
Multan Sultans cricketers
Medalists at the 2010 Asian Games
Punjab (Pakistan) cricketers
Southern Punjab (Pakistan) cricketers